André Antunes (23 June 1923 – 22 September 2002) was a Portuguese sports shooter. He competed at the 1960 Summer Olympics and the 1972 Summer Olympics.

References

External links
 

1923 births
2002 deaths
Portuguese male sport shooters
Olympic shooters of Portugal
Shooters at the 1960 Summer Olympics
Shooters at the 1972 Summer Olympics
20th-century Portuguese people